17th Avenue may refer to:
 International Avenue, Calgary, Alberta, Canada
 17th Avenue (Brooklyn), New York, United States